This is the list of futsal clubs in East Timor.

Pra Liga Futsal Timor-Leste 
The teams set to compete in the 2020–21 season of the Pra Liga Futsal Timor-Leste are:

 Academica FC
 Boavista FC
 Mauputar FC
 Maudoko FC
 Baucau All Star
 FC Bermeta
 Kuda Ulun FC
 Kablaki FC
 Boa Sorte FC
 FC FIEL
 FC Gamer
 Jerman FC
 Becusse United
 FC Estrela Baguia
 Sai Francisco Xavier FC
 Santa Cruz FC
 Caesar Dante FC
 Crazy Horse
 AD Samoro
 Ramelau FC
 FC B’Tal
 FC Coelho
 M-VDL FC
 Mushila FC

References 

Futsal in East Timor
East Timor
futsal
futsal